TKR may refer to:
 Keating TKR, an English car
 Team Kiwi Racing, a car racing team
 Team Knight Rider, a TV series
 Thakurgaon Airport (IATA airport code)
 Timken Company, a bearing manufacturer, NYSE symbol
 Trinbago Knight Riders, a Twenty20 cricket team